Papilio diophantus is a species of swallowtail butterfly from the genus Papilio that is found in Sumatra.

Description

Upperside. Dark brown. Anterior wing broader and not so curved on the costal margin as in Papilio helenus , which it resembles on the upperside. Posterior wing with a tail more spatulate than in P. Helenus, and tipped with cream colour,marked from the costal margin to the third hranch of the median nervule by a large cream-coloured spot, divided by the nervures into four parts, the lowest much smaller and more lunular than the other three parts.

Underside. Anterior wing with longitudinal rays of pale brown, narrowing from the centre of the wing to the interior margin to a band of same colour as the spot. The posterior wing has at the base of the costa, and between the costal and subcostal nervures, two broad lines of red, the latter nearly twice as long as the former, the large spot as above continued across the wing to the inner margin by a narrow band of lunular spots of same colour ; there is a small spot of the same colour at the anal angle, and another at the tip of the tail; the lunular spots between the nervures on the margin are more strongly marked than on the upperside

"Exp. 4 and 1/4 inches. Hab. Sumatra (Bock).
" In the Collection of Henley Grose Smith (H. G. S., in Entomologists Monthly Magazine,xix.,p. 234 (March, 1883)).
The specimen above described is a female. The male (the underside of which is figured) has the cream-coloured spot faintly continued on the upperside as far as the submedian nervure, and on the underside it is narrower at the inner margin. The white fringe at the tip of the tail in the female is reduced in the male to a white dot in the middle.

Taxonomy
Papilio  diophantus is a member of the fuscus species-group. The members of this clade are
 Papilio albinus Wallace, 1865
 Papilio diophantus Grose-Smith, 1883
 Papilio fuscus Goeze, 1779
 Papilio hipponous C. & R. Felder, 1862
 Papilio jordani Fruhstorfer, 1906
 Papilio pitmani Elwes & de Nicéville, [1887]
 Papilio prexaspes C. & R. Felder, 1865
 Papilio sakontala Hewitson, 1864

Biogeographic realm
This species is located in the Indomalayan realm (Sundaland).

References

diophantus
Butterflies of Indonesia
Lepidoptera of Sumatra
Endemic fauna of Indonesia
Butterflies described in 1883
Taxa named by Henley Grose-Smith